From the Earth to the Moon is a science fiction novel by Jules Verne.

From the Earth to the Moon may also refer to:

From the Earth to the Moon (film), a 1958 adaptation of the novel
From the Earth to the Moon (miniseries), a 1998 television miniseries about the U.S. Apollo Moon missions

See also
Le voyage dans la lune (operetta) (A Trip to the Moon), an operetta by Jacques Offenbach, based on Verne's novel
 A Trip to the Moon, for the film versions

zh:从地球到月球